The 2014 International Champions Cup (or ICC) was a friendly association football tournament played in the United States and Canada. It began on July 24 when Olympiacos defeated Milan 3–0 at BMO Field in Toronto, and ended on August 4 at Sun Life Stadium in Miami Gardens, Florida. This tournament followed the 2013 edition and was staged throughout the United States, with one match held in Canada (Toronto). The participating teams were Liverpool, Manchester City and Manchester United of England; Milan, Inter Milan and Roma of Italy; Olympiacos of Greece; and defending champions Real Madrid of Spain. Manchester United won the tournament, having beaten Liverpool 3–1 in the final.

The group match between Real Madrid and Manchester United at Michigan Stadium had an attendance of 109,318, a record crowd for a soccer match in the United States.

Teams

Venues

Format 

The tournament consisted of two groups of four: Group A and Group B. The groups were played as a round-robin, with each team playing three matches. The winners of each group played in the final at the Sun Life Stadium on August 4.

Three points were awarded for a win in regulation time, two for a win by penalty shootout, one for a loss by penalty shootout, and zero for a loss in regulation time. A team's placing was based on (a) points earned in the three group matches (b) head-to-head result, (c) goal differential, (d) goals scored.

Group stage

Group A

Matches

Group B

Matches

Final

Top goalscorers

Media coverage

See also 
 World Football Challenge, an exhibition tournament for mid-season American clubs and pre-season European clubs that was held from 2009 until 2012

References

External links 
 International Champions Cup Official Site

International Champions Cup
International Champions Cup